George Perkins Marsh (March 15, 1801July 23, 1882), an American diplomat and philologist, is considered by some to be America's first environmentalist and by recognizing the irreversible impact of man's actions on the earth, a precursor to the sustainability concept, although "conservationist" would be more accurate. The Marsh-Billings-Rockefeller National Historical Park in Vermont takes its name, in part, from Marsh. His 1864 book Man and Nature had a great impact in many parts of the world.

Biography 

George Perkins Marsh was born in Woodstock, Vermont, to a prominent family. His father, Charles Marsh, had been a member of the U.S. House of Representatives.  George Marsh graduated from Phillips Academy, Andover, Massachusetts, in 1816 and from Dartmouth College with highest honors in 1820 and taught at Norwich University the following year. He studied law in Burlington, Vermont, was admitted to the bar in 1825, and practiced law in Burlington. He also devoted himself to philological studies. In 1835 he was appointed to the Executive Council of Vermont, and from 1843 to 1849 was a Whig representative in Congress. He served as an editor of Ancient Monuments of the Mississippi Valley which was published in 1848.

In 1849 President Zachary Taylor appointed Marsh United States minister resident in the Ottoman Empire. He rendered valuable service to the cause of civil and religious toleration in that empire. In 1852–1853, he discharged a mission to Greece in connection with the imprisonment of American missionary Jonas King. He accomplished this task with a vigor that surprised the diplomats of Athens and showed a masterly knowledge of the Greek constitution and legislation, as well as of international law.

In 1849, Marsh was elected as a member of the American Philosophical Society.

Marsh was elected a member of the American Antiquarian Society in 1851.

He returned to Vermont in 1854. In 1857 he was appointed by the governor of Vermont to make a report to the legislature in regard to the artificial propagation of fish. He had previously been appointed one of the commissioners to rebuild the state house at Montpelier and in 1857 was appointed as the state railroad commissioner, succeeding Charles Linsley.

In 1861, President Abraham Lincoln appointed Marsh the first United States minister to the Kingdom of Italy. Marsh would go on to be the longest-serving chief of mission in U.S. history, serving as envoy for 21 years until his death at Vallombrosa in 1882. He is buried at the Protestant Cemetery in Rome.

Work
Marsh was an able linguist, able to both speak and write fluently in Swedish and over 20 other languages. He was a remarkable philologist for his day, and a scholar of great breadth, knowing much of military science, engraving and physics, as well as Icelandic, which was his specialty. He wrote many articles for Johnson's Universal Cyclopaedia, and contributed many reviews and letters to The Nation.

He was an admirer of the Goths, whose presence he traced in whatever is great and peculiar in the character of the founders of New England. He owned the finest collection of Scandinavian literature outside of Scandinavia. Part of it ultimately became the property of the University of Vermont, through the liberality of Frederick Billings. During the winter of 1858/9 he began a course of thirty lectures on the English language at Columbia University, and a year later he delivered a second course, on the grammatical history of English literature, before the Lowell Institute, in Boston. Marsh played a role in the creation of the first edition of the Oxford English Dictionary by acting as Coordinator of the American readers.

In 1847 Marsh gave a speech 
to the Agricultural Society of Rutland County, Vermont, adhering to the idea that man's activities influence local and regional climate by cutting and clearing forests, and draining swamps. This was a common debate among philosophers, naturalists, and local elites on both sides of the Atlantic Ocean during the Enlightenment era, including David Hume, Comte de Buffon, Thomas Jefferson, Hugh Williamson, Alexander von Humboldt, Charles Lyell, and many others in the turn of the eighteenth to the nineteenth centuries:

"Man cannot at his pleasure command the rain and the sunshine, the wind and frost and snow, yet it is certain that climate itself has in many instances been gradually changed and ameliorated 
or deteriorated by human action.  The draining of swamps and the clearing of forests perceptibly affect the evaporation from the earth, and of course the mean quantity of moisture suspended 
in the air.  The same causes modify the electrical condition of the atmosphere and the power of the surface to reflect, absorb and radiate the rays of the sun, and consequently influence the 
distribution of light and heat, and the force and direction of the winds.  Within narrow limits too, domestic fires and artificial structures create and diffuse increased warmth, to an extent 
that may affect vegetation.  The mean temperature of London is a degree or two higher than that of the surrounding country, and Pallas believed, that the climate of even so thinly a peopled country 
as Russia was sensibly modified by similar causes."

His book Man and Nature (1864) constituted an early work of ecology, and played a role in the creation of the Adirondack Park.  Marsh argued that deforestation could lead to desertification. Referring to the clearing of once-lush lands surrounding the Mediterranean, he asserted "the operation of causes set in action by man has brought the face of the earth to a desolation almost as complete as that of the moon." He argued that welfare is secured as long as man manages resources and keep them in good condition. Welfare of future generations should be one of resource management determinants. Resource scarcity is a result of misbalancing an environmental equilibrium. In other words: it comes from unreasonable human action rather than is determined by some absolute resource scarcity.

Works

A Compendious Grammar of the Old Northern or Icelandic Language (1838), compiled and translated from the grammars of Rask
The Camel, his Organization, Habits, and Uses, with Reference to his Introduction into the United States (1856)
Lectures on the English Language (1860)
The Origin and History of the English Language (1862; revised ed., 1885)
Man and Nature (1864; Italian tr. 1872)
The Earth as Modified by Human Action (1874; rev. ed., 1885), a largely rewritten version of Man and Nature
 Mediaeval and Modern Saints and Miracles (1876)

He prepared an American edition of Hensleigh Wedgwood's Dictionary of English Etymology (New York, 1862), to which he made large additions and annotations. He translated Rask's Icelandic Grammar.

Family
His second wife, Caroline (Crane) Marsh (1816–1901), whom he married in 1839, published Wolfe of the Knoll and other Poems (1860), and the Life and Letters of George Perkins Marsh (New York, 1888). This last work was left incomplete, the second volume never having been published. She also translated from the German of Johann C. Biernatzki (1795–1840), The Hallig; or the Sheepfold in the Waters (1856). (See "Hallig").

Art collection
Marsh actively studied and collected engravings, including European Old Master prints. His collection included more than a thousand prints by various artists, dating from the 15th to the 19th centuries, representing works by Rembrandt, Albrecht Dürer, William Hogarth and others. In 1849, the Smithsonian Institution purchased a large group of Marsh's European prints and art books, which was transferred on deposit to the Library of Congress in 1865. During the 1880s and 1890s, the Smithsonian got some of the Marsh Collection returned, but part of it still remains at the Library of Congress.

See also
 Environmental Movement

Notes

References

Further reading 
 Curtis, Jane; Will Curtis; and Frank Lieberman. (1982). The World of George Perkins Marsh. Woodstock, VT: Countryman Press.
 Dolling, Lisa M., ed. George Perkins Marsh: An American For All Seasons (Hoboken: Stevens Institute of Technology, 2013), 179 pp. 
 Garvey, T. Gregory. (2009). "The Civic Intent of George Perkins Marsh’s Anthrocentric Environmentalism," New England Quarterly 82 (March), 80–111.
 Hall, Marcus, ed. (2004). The Nature of G.P. Marsh:  Tradition and Historical Judgement.  Special issue of Environment and History 10 (2).
 Linehan, Peter. "The Teacher and the Forest: The Pennsylvania Forestry Association, George Perkins Marsh, and the Origins of Conservation Education." Pennsylvania History: A Journal of Mid-Atlantic Studies (2012) 79#4 pp: 520–536.
 Lowenthal, David. (2000). George Perkins Marsh: Prophet of Conservation. Seattle: University of Washington Press.

Primary sources
 Ducci, Lucia. George P. Marsh Correspondence: Images of Italy, 1861–1881 (Lexington Books, 2011)

External links

George Perkins Marsh (1801–1882) on the website of the Office of the Historian, U.S. Department of State

 About George Perkins Marsh on the website of The George Perkins Marsh Institute at Clark University
 
 
 National Academy of Sciences Biographical Memoir
 The Marsh Collection at The National Museum of American History

 
1801 births
1882 deaths
American conservationists
American hunters
American non-fiction environmental writers
American philologists
Dartmouth College alumni
Writers from Vermont
Burials in the Protestant Cemetery, Rome
19th-century American writers
19th-century American diplomats
Ambassadors of the United States to Italy
Ambassadors of the United States to the Ottoman Empire
Whig Party members of the United States House of Representatives from Vermont
American art collectors
Members of the American Antiquarian Society
19th-century American politicians
Environmental historians